Africatown or Little Africa may refer to:

Africatown in Mobile, Alabama, generally referred to as "Africatown USA"
Africatown Seattle, various organizations in the Central District of the U.S. city of Seattle
Africville, in Halifax, Nova Scotia, Canada.
Greenwood District, Tulsa, variously known as "Africa Town", "Negro Wall Street", and "Black Wall Street" until the Tulsa race massacre of 1921
Kavir National Park in Iran is sometimes known as "Little Africa"
Little Africa, South Carolina
Little Africa, an area, the centre of which is Pedra do Sal, Saúde, Rio de Janeiro, Brazil
Little Africa, in New York City a historic name for several neighborhoods:
"Stagg Town" in Five Points, Manhattan (early 19th century)
Little Africa, Manhattan in Greenwich Village (later 19th - early 20th century)
Sandy Ground in Staten Island
Watthana District, Bangkok, Thailand
Yuexiu District, Guangzhou, China

See also
African-American neighborhood, in the United States of America
Africville, neighbourhood in Halifax, Nova Scotia, Canada
Goutte d'Or, a neighborhood in Paris that has a large numbers of North African residents, known as "Little Africa"